Senator Kuykendall may refer to:

Andrew J. Kuykendall (1815–1891), Illinois State Senate
Elgin V. Kuykendall (1870–1958), Washington State Senate